The Wolf River Conservancy (WRC) is a non-profit 501(c)(3) organization whose stated purpose is "conserving and enhancing the Wolf River and its environs as a natural resource for public education and low-impact recreational activities." Headquartered in Memphis, Tennessee. It has approximately 1,500 members from throughout West Tennessee, led by an active Board of Directors and staff and advised by the Wolf River Conservancy Trustees. It is a fully accredited member of The Land Trust Alliance.

Mission
The Wolf River Conservancy is dedicated to the protection and enhancement of the Wolf River and its watershed as a sustainable natural resource.

WRC history

The WRC was formed in 1985 by a small group of people concerned about a new dredging and infill project on the Wolf River in Memphis. They had witnessed the effects of similar development-related degradation along nearby Nonconnah Creek.  That small group has grown to include more than members from every community along the river. For ten years the group's emphasis was in advocacy and education—commenting on wetland destruction or encouraging activities on the river during Wolf River Days. Only later did the group become a land trust organization by holding land or conservation easements in its own name.

Ghost River campaign
The change occurred when WRC, the Tennessee Department of Environment and Conservation, the Tennessee Wildlife Resources Agency, and local conservationists W.S. "Babe" Howard and Lucius Burch merged their collective resources to satisfy the public's outcry for the protection of the Ghost River section of the Wolf near LaGrange, Tennessee. During 1995, 4,500 acres (18 km²) -- including the Ghost River—were saved from a land and timber company auction. This area was ultimately brought into public ownership as the Wolf River Wildlife Management Area and the Ghost River State Natural Area.

Present day
With a dramatic increase in concern for the Wolf River by an increasingly more environmentally sensitive public, the Wolf River Conservancy continues to advance in new arenas, like the City of Memphis' Wolf River Greenway Master Plan, the Army Corps of Engineers/Shelby County Wolf River Restoration project in Collierville, recreational facilities at the river's source in the Holly Springs National Forest, as well as continued efforts to conserve and enhance the river's bottomland forests in Fayette and Benton counties.

Wolf River Greenway 
The Wolf River Greenway will be a 26-mile multi-use path following the Wolf River through Memphis from Mud Island to Germantown. It connects to Greenbelt Park, Germantown Greenway, Shelby Farms, and the Shelby Farms Greenline. It is planned to connect to the future Heights Line and Chelsea Greenline.

As of early 2023, the completed sections are:

 Mud Island (Mud Island to Second St): The Mud Island Section of the Wolf River Greenway opened to the public in October of 2017. This scenic portion of the Greenway features a 1.2 mile loop along the old Wolf River Levee built to divert the flow of the Wolf River in 1960.
 North McLean Cycle Track (McLean: Chelsea to Nedra and McLean: Nedra to Rodney Baber Park): Built atop a levee, the Hollywood section and McLean Cycle track compose 3.3 miles of the Wolf River Greenway trail through the Hyde Park neighborhood of Memphis, TN.
 Hyde Park (McLean to Hollywood): The Hollywood section features a trailhead parking area along N Hollywood Street and connects to the McLean Cycle Track to the west.
 N Highland to Epping Way
 Epping Way: The Epping Way section of the Wolf River Greenway Trail system can be found on 138 acres of scenic riverfront property, owned by the Wolf River Conservancy. This section of the Greenway features a 20 acre lake, 1.2 miles of pedestrian trails with two picturesque bridges.
 Kennedy Park: The Kennedy Park section of the Wolf River Greenway opened in 2018 and  features 1.5 miles of scenic recreational trails running through a mature forest, bounding along the rolling hills and banks of the Wolf River.
 East Section (Walnut Grove to Shady Grove, to City of Germantown): The East Section of the Wolf River Greenway consists of 3.6 miles of paved trail that is currently open to the public. This section offers an intimate natural experience winding near the flowing Wolf River 
 Wolf Crossing: The Wolf Crossing section, located at mile 14, opened in 2021 connecting Shelby Farms Greenline and the Wolf River Greenway Trail further. This section boasts a 270-foot cable stayed suspension bridge over the Wolf River, and a raised concrete boardwalk through the scenic Lucius Burch State Natural Area.

History of the Wolf River itself
 10,000 BCE Wolf River formed by runoff from melting glacier shelf.
 800-1500 CE Mississippian culture rises and declines in this area, evidenced by mound sites and accounts by Hernando de Soto.
 1300-1700 CE Chickasaw nation settles northern Mississippi, western Tennessee, and eastern Arkansas.
 1682 French explorer Robert Cavelier de La Salle claims the region near the mouth of the Wolf River. The French alternately called the river Riviere de Mayot (or Margot), Blackbird River, and Riviere de Loup.
The original Loup was rumored to be a Delaware Indian guide who disappeared along the river while guiding the French. The Delawares were also known as Les Loups or "The Wolves". According to one account, both the English and Chickasaw afterwards called the river "Loup" in their respective languages: "Wolf" and "Nashoba".
 1740 Non-local Native American scouts working for the French at Fort Assumption (Memphis) survey the Wolf as a possible military supply route from which to destroy Ackia, a Chickasaw stronghold near Tupelo that weathered an attack four years earlier. The group turned back near present-day Germantown, Tennessee, a town that briefly adopted the name "Neshoba" out of anti-German sentiment during the United States' involvement in World War I.
 Early 19th century The Wolf River is declared navigable, from Memphis to LaGrange, by the Tennessee General Assembly, which appropriated funds to remove obstructions for keel boat travel.
 1825 British-born Frances Wright establishes the Nashoba Commune on the Wolf River at the present-day site of Germantown, Tennessee. The commune's purpose was to educate and emancipate slaves using proceeds from the sale of crops grown there.
 1888 Memphis stops using Wolf River as its principal source of drinking water, switching to artesian wells, which are still used and which are recharged by the Wolf's watershed.
1960 Because of its foul odor the Wolf is dammed near its mouth and diverted into the Mississippi north of Mud Island. The section of the Wolf downstream of this channel diversion became a slackwater harbor of the Mississippi known today as Wolf River Harbor, which separates Mud Island from the Memphis "mainland".
 Mid-1960s Completion of channelization of the Wolf from the Mississippi upstream to Gray's Creek, east of Germantown, Tennessee, resulting in a lowered riverbed and diminished wetland habitat.
 1970 Surface drainage, sewage, and industrial pollution caused a group of scientists and environmentalists to pronounce the river "dead" around Memphis.
 1977 Mary Winslow Chapman publishes I Remember Raleigh, which including vivid descriptions of a pre-channelized Wolf River (early-to-middle 20th century).
 1985 Wolf River Conservancy founded by an alliance of conservation-minded real estate executives and local environmental advocates.
 1995 "Ghost River" section of the Wolf saved from timber auction by a coordinated effort of the Tennessee Wildlife Resources Agency, the Tennessee Department of Environment and Conservation, local conservation activists Lucius Burch and W.S. "Babe" Howard, and the WRC.
 1997 American Singer-Songwriter Jeff Buckley drowns during an evening swim in Wolf River Harbor.
 1998 First recorded full descent of the Wolf River completed by members of the Wolf River Conservancy.
 2004 City of Memphis' Wolf River Greenway, 22 mile (35 km) trail, master plan completed and then shelved (pending approval)
 2005 Commencement of the Wolf River Restoration Project by the U.S. Army Corps of Engineers, Memphis Office to stop rapid erosion known as "headcutting" at Collierville, Tennessee.
 2006 Loop trail completed by the U.S. Forest Service in the Holly Springs National Forest (Mississippi) near Baker's Pond, the source of the Wolf River.
 2007 "Middle Wolf" Campaign – attempted sprawl-proofing of the western Fayette County section.
 2007–2012 Completion of the Collierville-Arlington Parkway segment of Tenn-385 and I-269 outer loop expressway, including two (and potentially five) interchanges poised to become major drivers of suburban growth into forested sections of the Wolf River's floodplain and the surface-exposed sections of the Memphis Sands aquifer.

See also
Wolf River (Tennessee)
Land trust
Wetlands
Shelby Farms

References

External links
 Wolf River Conservancy site
 Shelby Farms Park
 Wolf River Conservancy's Flickr group, gallery of photographs of the Wolf River and its environs, taken by WRC members and supporters.

Conservation and environmental foundations in the United States
Land trusts in the United States
Conservation projects in the United States
Environmental organizations based in Tennessee
Organizations based in Memphis, Tennessee
Water organizations in the United States
Environmental organizations established in 1985
1985 establishments in Tennessee